NBL1 West, formerly the State Basketball League (SBL), is a semi-professional basketball league in Western Australia, comprising both a men's and women's competition. In 2020, Basketball Western Australia partnered with the National Basketball League (NBL) to bring NBL1 to Western Australia. NBL1 replaced the former SBL to create more professional pathways and opportunities for males and females playing basketball in Western Australia. As a result, the SBL became the west conference of NBL1.

History

The State Basketball League originated in 1972 as the District Competition. The District Competition was introduced by the Western Australian Basketball Federation (WABF) as an 'elite' competition held on Friday nights, featuring eight Perth-based associations from the prominent districts of Perth, Swan Districts, Tangney/Willetton, Subiaco, East Perth, Cockburn, Stirling, and Claremont. In 1986, the competition was rebranded as the "State League". This name continued in 1987, but 1987 was something of a watershed year for the WABF, as the entire structure of the game in Western Australia was being reconsidered.

A census in 1987 showed that 61 percent of WABF members were from country areas, so it was decided to try to include several country teams in the state's premier basketball league. The Perth Wildcats had a hugely successful season in 1987—reaching the NBL Grand Final in their first trip to the finals—attracting much television coverage, which saw basketball's popularity soar. In 1988, it was decided to form a State Basketball League for both men and women, and to develop it into an elite, statewide competition as soon as possible. This meant seeking out private owners and attracting corporate sponsorship, so as to not burden the association. As part of basketball's development, the Western Australian Institute of Sport men's team was included in the SBL under Warren Kuhn.

Simon Leunig, who had been the WABF's development officer, was appointed general manager of the SBL, and set about organising an expanded league for 1989. His marketing strategy paid off, and three new franchises were established in country areas: the Rainbow Coast Raiders from Albany were the first, followed by the Batavia Buccaneers from Geraldton and the Souwest Slammers from Bunbury.

The expanded SBL, which was limited to men's teams in 1989, was sponsored by McDonald's and Skywest, with a $65,000 grant from the State Government to help with travel costs.

In 2017, the SBL shifted to the 40-minute game format in-line with FIBA, with games consisting of ten minute quarters as opposed to the twelve minute quarters under the previous 48-minute format.

In October 2020, Basketball Western Australia and the National Basketball League (NBL) announced a new partnership to bring NBL1 to Western Australia in 2021, with NBL1 replacing the SBL. The SBL was officially renamed NBL1 West and became the west conference of NBL1.

Current clubs

Women's teams

Men's teams

League championships

The Willetton Tigers have won the most championships in the women's competition with 9 Grand Final wins, while the Perry Lakes Hawks have won the most championships in the men's competition with 7 Grand Final wins. The Hawks women have also amassed seven titles, making Perry Lakes the most successful club in league history with a total of 14 championships.

See also 
 List of NBL1 West awards
 List of NBL1 West champions

References

External links 

 
 Old SBL website

 
NBL1
 
Basketball in Western Australia
Basketball leagues in Australia
1989 establishments in Australia
Sports leagues established in 1989